Satyanweshi may refer to:
 Satyanweshi (film), a 2013 Bengali film
 Satyanweshi (novel), a 1934 novel by Sharadindu Bandyopadhyay